László Decker (1923 – 1998) was a Hungarian rower. He competed in the men's coxless four event at the 1952 Summer Olympics.

References

1923 births
1998 deaths
Hungarian male rowers
Olympic rowers of Hungary
Rowers at the 1952 Summer Olympics
Rowers from Budapest